Emerald frog may refer to:

 Emerald forest frog (Hylorina sylvatica), a frog in the family Batrachylidae found in Argentina and Chile
 Emerald glass frog (Centrolene prosoblepon), a frog in the family Centrolenidae found in Colombia, Costa Rica, Ecuador, Honduras, Nicaragua, and Panama
 Emerald poison frog (Ameerega smaragdinus), frog in the family Dendrobatidae endemic to Peru
 Emerald tree frog (Exerodonta smaragdina), a frog in the family Hylidae endemic to Mexico

Animal common name disambiguation pages